Dionisio Fernández (born 4 October 1907, date of death unknown) was a Spanish boxer. He competed in the men's welterweight event at the 1928 Summer Olympics.

References

1907 births
Year of death missing
Spanish male boxers
Olympic boxers of Spain
Boxers at the 1928 Summer Olympics
People from Zamora, Spain
Sportspeople from the Province of Zamora
Welterweight boxers